The IBSF World Under-18 Snooker Championship (also known as the World Amateur Under-18 Snooker Championship) is a high-ranking non-professional junior snooker tournament. The event series is sanctioned by the International Billiards and Snooker Federation and started from 2015. The inaugural tournament was won by Ka Wai Cheung who defeated fellow countryman Ming Tung Chan 5–2 in the final. Yana Shut won the inaugural women's championship.

Winners

Men's

Women's

See also 
 World Snooker Tour
 IBSF World Snooker Championship
 IBSF World Under-21 Snooker Championship
 World Open Under-16 Snooker Championships

References 

Snooker amateur competitions
Recurring sporting events established in 2015
World championships in snooker
Under-18 sport